The  of 2-C+C-2 wheel arrangement DC electric locomotives was a development of the previous JNR Class EF56. 15 Class EF57s were built between 1939 and 1943 by Hitachi and Kawasaki.

Introduced on Tokaido Line passenger services, they were seen at the head of expresses such as the Tsubame, complete with train headboard mounted precariously on the front of the cab decks. With the introduction of the newer semi-streamlined Class EF58s on Tokaido Line services, the EF57s were transferred to the Tohoku Main Line. At the same time, their steam-heating boilers were removed and replaced by electric-heating generators.

The class remained in use on long-distance express trains on the Tohoku Main Line until the 1970s.

Preserved examples
Only one member of the class is preserved: EF57 7 in a park in Utsunomiya, Tochigi Prefecture.

See also
 Japan Railways locomotive numbering and classification

References

 

Electric locomotives of Japan
Hitachi locomotives
Kawasaki locomotives
1067 mm gauge locomotives of Japan
2-C+C-2 locomotives
1500 V DC locomotives
Preserved electric locomotives
Railway locomotives introduced in 1939